These are lists of prominent Turkish Albanians, arranged by field of activity.

Politicians 
Bayezid II  –    Eldest son and successor of Mehmed II, ruling as Sultan of the Ottoman Empire from 1481 to 1512
Mehmed III  –  Sultan of the Ottoman Empire from 1595 until his death in 1603
Bayezid Pasha – Ottoman statesman who served as grand vizier of the Ottoman Empire from 1413 to 1417 
Zagan Pasha – Grand vizier of the Ottoman Empire from 1453 to 1456
Ishak Pasha –   Ottoman general, statesman, and later Grand Vizier
Koca Davud Pasha  –  Albanian general and grand vizier of the Ottoman Empire from 1482 to 1497
Dukakinzade Ahmed Pasha –  Ottoman statesman, serving as Grand Vizier of the Ottoman Empire from 1512 to 1515
Ayas Mehmed Pasha –   Ottoman statesman and grand vizier of the Ottoman Empire from 1536 to 1539
Lütfi Pasha –   Ottoman statesman and grand vizier of the Ottoman Empire
Kara Ahmed Pasha –  Ottoman statesman and grand vizier
Şemsi Pasha –  Ottoman nobleman and statesman
Koca Sinan Pasha –  Ottoman Grand Vizier, military figure, and statesman
Serdar Ferhad Pasha –  Ottoman Grand Vizier
Hadım Hasan Pasha –  Ottoman Grand vizier  He was also the Ottoman governor of Egypt from 1580 to 1583.
Yemişçi Hasan Pasha –  Ottoman Grand vizier
Nasuh Pasha –    Ottoman statesman
Ohrili Hüseyin Pasha –   Ottoman statesman
Mere Hüseyin Pasha –   Grand Vizier of the Ottoman Empire in 1622 and 1623
Tabanıyassı Mehmed Pasha –   Ottoman statesman, who held the office of Grand Vizier
Kemankeş Kara Mustafa Pasha –  Ottoman military officer and statesman. He served as Kapudan Pasha and as grand vizier
Sultanzade Mehmed Pasha – Ottoman statesman who was the grand vizier of the Ottoman Empire
Kara Murat Pasha –    Ottoman statesman and military officer
Tarhoncu Ahmed Pasha –   Grand Vizier of the Ottoman Empire from 20 June 1652 until 21 March 1653 
Zurnazen Mustafa Pasha –   Grand Vizier of the Ottoman Empire for 4 hours
Köprülü Mehmed Pasha –   Founder of the Köprülü political dynasty of the Ottoman Empire
Köprülüzade Fazıl Ahmed Pasha –   Member of the renowned Köprülü family originating from Albania, which produced six grand viziers of the Ottoman Empire.
Kara Mustafa Pasha –  Ottoman military commander and Grand Vizier, who was a central character in the Ottoman Empire's last attempts at expansion into both Central and Eastern Europe
Köprülüzade Fazıl Mustafa Pasha –  Grand Vizier of the Ottoman Empire from 1689 to 1691
Arabacı Ali Pasha – Ottoman grand vizier from 1691 to 1692
Amcazade Köprülü Hüseyin Pasha –   Grand vizier of the Ottoman Empire under Mustafa II from September 1697 until September 1702
Köprülüzade Numan Pasha – Ottoman statesman who was the grand vizier of the Ottoman Empire
Hacı Halil Pasha –   Ottoman Grand vizier
Ivaz Mehmed Pasha –    Ottoman grand vizier and provincial governor
Ivazzade Halil Pasha –  Ottoman statesman who served as Grand Vizier in 1769
Alemdar Mustafa Pasha –    Ottoman military commander and a Grand Vizier
Mustafa Naili Pasha –   Ottoman statesman, who held the office of Grand Vizier twice during the reign of Abdülmecid I
Mehmed Ferid Pasha –   Ottoman statesman and Grand Vizier of the Ottoman Empire
Said Halim Pasha –   Ottoman statesman and Grand Vizier of the Ottoman Empire
Abdi Pasha the Albanian –   Ottoman politician and military leader
Damat Ferid Pasha –   Ottoman statesman, who held the office of Grand Vizier
Tabanıyassı Mehmed Pasha –  Ottoman statesman
Şemsi Pasha –  prominent Ottoman nobleman and statesman
Said Halim Pasha –  Ottoman statesman
Gedik Ahmed Pasha –   Ottoman statesman and admiral
Mehmet Akif Ersoy –  Ottoman born Turkish poet, writer, academic, member of parliament, and the author of the Turkish National Anthem
Djevdet Bey –  Governor of the Van vilayet of the Ottoman Empire during World War I and the Siege of Van
Reshid Akif Pasha –   Ottoman statesman during the last decades of the Ottoman Empire
Mehmed Ferid Pasha –  Ottoman statesman
Abdülhalik Renda – Turkish civil servant and politician.
Abdülkadir Aksu – Turkish politician 
Eyüp Sabri Akgöl – Adjuntant Major, CUP member and a leader of the Young Turk revolution (1908), parliamentarian 
Ahmet Piriştina – two term mayor (1999–2004) of Turkey's third largest city, Izmir
Hüseyin Numan Menemencioğlu – Turkish diplomat and politician
Elyesa Bazna – Secret agent for Nazi Germany during World War II
Mehmet Fuat Köprülü –   Influential Turkish Turcologist, scholar, Minister of Foreign Affairs and Deputy Prime Minister of the Republic of Turkey.
Ahmet Erdem –   Turkish civil servant who served as the Minister of Labour and Social Security in the interim election government formed by Prime Minister Ahmet Davutoğlu between 28 August and 17 November 2015
Necdet Menzir –   Turkish bureaucrat and politician who served as Minister of Transport from 1997 to 1998
Kemal Derviş –   Turkish economist and politician, and former head of the United Nations Development Programme
Mustafa Kemal Kurdaş –   Turkish politician

Business
Özhan Canaydın – Businessman, basketball player and former chairman of the Turkish sports club Galatasaray

Academics
Murat Çetinkaya –   Current Governor of the Central Bank of the Republic of Turkey appointed in April 2016
Erdem Başçı –   Turkish economist and the former Governor of the Central Bank of the Republic of Turkey
Osman Birsen –   Turkish high-ranking civil servant for finance and was the CEO of the Istanbul Stock Exchange between 1997 and 2007
Meltem Arıkan –  Turkish novelist and playwright
Musa Hakan Asyalı –  Turkish scientist and professor of biomedical engineering
Necati Cumalı –  Turkish writer of novels, short-stories, essays and poetry
Erhan Tabakoglu –  Turkish professor of medicine at Trakya University
Can Dündar –  Turkish journalist, columnist and documentarian
Bilgin Çelik   –  Turkish historian

Military 
Enver Pasha –  Ottoman military officer 
Kara Mustafa Pasha –  Ottoman military commander and Grand Vizier, who was a central character in the Ottoman Empire's last attempts at expansion into both Central and Eastern Europe.
Patrona Halil –  Instigator of a mob uprising in 1730 which replaced Sultan Ahmed III with Mahmud I and ended the Tulip period
Nuri Killigil –  Ottoman general in the Ottoman Army
Yakup Ağa – Ottoman Sipahi
Oruç Reis –  Greek-Albanian Ottoman bey
Kâzım Özalp –  Turkish military officer, politician, and one of the leading figures in the Turkish War of Independence.
Hayrullah Fişek – Officer in the Turkish army
Mehmet Esat Bülkat –  Ottoman general active during the First Balkan War
Hayreddin Barbarossa – Ottoman admiral of the fleet
Faik Pasha – General of the Ottoman Army, and the grandmaster of Freemasonry in the Ottoman Empire
Mahmud Dramali Pasha –   Ottoman statesman and military leader
Hasan Tahsin Pasha –  Ottoman military officer, who served in Yemen and in the First Balkan War.
Alemdar Mustafa Pasha –  Ottoman military commander and a Grand Vizier
Ahmed Izzet Pasha – Ottoman general during World War I
Wehib Pasha – General in the Ottoman Army
Ismail Fazıl Pasha – General of the Ottoman Army
Ishak Pasha –  Ottoman general, statesman, and later Grand Vizier
Şefik Aker –  Officer of the Ottoman Army and the Turkish Army
Kara Murat Pasha –   Ottoman statesman and military officer
Hasan Rami Pasha – Ottoman career officer
İzzettin Çalışlar –   Officer of the Ottoman Army and the general of the Turkish Army
Nurettin Ersin –   Turkish general. He was the Commander of the 6th Corps during the 1974 invasion of Cyprus, and the Commander of the Turkish Army during the 1980 military coup
Çevik Bir  –   Retired Turkish army general

Authors and Architects

Rıza Tevfik Bölükbaşı  –  Turkish philosopher, poet, politician of liberal signature and a community leader
Abedin Dino  –  Turkish artist and a well-known painter
Hodja Ali Rıza  –  Turkish painter and art teacher
Sedefkar Mehmed Agha  –  Turkish famous architect
Architect Kasemi  –  Turkish architect
Mesihi of Prishtina  –  Ottoman-Turkish architect
Pelin Batu  –   Turkish author, actress, historian, and television personality

Cinema 
Kıvanç Tatlıtuğ – Turkish actor 
Halit Ergenç – Actor, Ergenç's mother was of Albanian descent
Barış Arduç – Actor and Model, born in Switzerland in the family of Albanian immigrants
Bergüzar Korel –  Turkish actress
Kaan Urgancıoğlu – Turkish actor 
İrem Helvacıoğlu –  Turkish actress
Filiz Akın –  Turkish actress
Fikret Kuşkan –  Turkish actor
Nur Fettahoğlu – Turkish female actress
Can Yaman –  Turkish actor and lawyer
Evrim Akın –  Turkish actress
Nur Sürer –   Turkish actress
Meral Çetinkaya –   Turkish film actress
Şehnaz Dilan –   Turkish former women's footballer, model, film and TV actress and singer
Demet Evgar –   Turkish actress
Begüm Kütük –   Turkish actress and model
Erdal Beşikçioğlu –   Turkish actor
Saruhan Hünel –   Turkish actor
Pelin Karahan –   Turkish actress
Hilal Altınbilek –   Turkish actress
Melis Sezen –   Turkish actress
Nurettin Sönmez –   Turkish actor and martial arts teacher
Didem Balçın, Turkish actress
Ezgi Eyüboğlu  -  Turkish actress
Burak Yörük - Turkish actor

Musicians 
Candan Erçetin  Turkish singer
Simge Sağın – Turkish female singer, songwriter and composer
Yeşim Salkım – Turkish singer 
Soner Özbilen –  Turkish folk singer, conductor, and compiler
Engin Noyan –  Turkish musician
Derya Uluğ –  Turkish singer
Fuat Güner –  Turkish pop musician
Arif Şentürk –  traditional folk singer and compiler
Fettah Can –  Turkish singer and songwriter
Metin Şentürk  -  Turkish pop singer
Zeynep Bastık –  Turkish singer, songwriter and actress

Models 
Ebru Şallı –   Television personality, model, businesswoman, author, actress, and former beauty pageant titleholder from Turkey
Gizem Karaca –  Turkish actress and model

Sportspeople 
Ali Sami Yen – Albanian-Turkish sports official best known as the founder of the Galatasaray Sports Club
Qemal Omari – Turkish former football player and manager and a founding member of Istanbulspor
İlhan Cavcav – Former President of Gençlerbirliği S.K.
Hakan Şükür – Footballer Şükür is of Kosovar Albanian origin
Arif Erdem – football player
Ayhan Akman – retired Turkish footballer who last played for Galatasaray
Emre Belözoğlu – Turkish footballer of Albanian origin
Kenan Sipahi –  Kosovo-born Turkish professional basketball player
Necip Uysal – Uysal's parent are of Kosovo Albanian origin 
Serdar Kurtuluş – Turkish footballer of Albanian origin 
Serkan Kurtuluş – football player
Ergün Berisha – football player
Mehmet Okur – Basketball player
Erkan Kaş – Turkish footballer who plays for Kayserispor
Erten Ersu – Turkish footballer who plays for Fenerbahçe
Eray İşcan – Turkish professional footballer who plays as a goalkeeper for Süper Lig club Galatasaray.
Ufuk Ceylan – Turkish professional footballer
Fuat Yaman –  Turkish football coach
Okan Kocuk –  Turkish professional footballer
Berkay Can Değirmencioğlu –  Turkish footballer
Derya Arhan –  Turkish women's football defender
Sertan Vardar –  Turkish professional footballer
Ersun Yanal –  Turkish professional manager
Orhan Ak –  Turkish former professional footballer
Gökhan Güleç –  Turkish former footballer
Sevgi Salmanlı –  Turkish women's football forward 
Emre Mor- Turkish footballer with an Albanian mother form North Macedonia 
Berkay Vardar –  Turkish professional footballer
Arda Kurtulan –  Turkish professional footballer

Writers 
Namık Kemal –  Ottoman democrat, writer, intellectual, reformer, journalist, playwright, and political activist
Gökşin Sipahioğlu –  Turkish photographer and journalist who founded the renowned Paris-based photo agency Sipa Press
Hayati Çitaklar –   Young Turkish playwright, director, novelist, actor and poet

References

Turkey
Turkey
Ethnic groups in Turkey